p-Menthane is a hydrocarbon with the formula (CH3)2CHC6H10CH3.  It is the product of the hydrogenation or hydrogenolysis of various terpenoids, including p-cymene, terpinolenes, phellandrene, and limonene.  It is a colorless liquid with a fragrant fennel-like odor.  It occurs naturally, especially in exudates of Eucalyptus fruits.  The compound is generally encountered as a mixture of the cis and trans isomers, which have very similar properties.  It is mainly used as a precursor to its hydroperoxide, which is used to initiate polymerizations.

References

Hydrocarbons
Perfume ingredients
Cyclohexanes
Isopropyl compounds